The Army of the Lord, also known as The Lord's Army, is an evangelical "renewal movement within the Romanian Orthodox Church". The founder of the Army of the Lord, Father Iosif Trifa, as well as consequent leaders, Ioan Marini and Traian Dorz, felt that "people needed to come to the gospel and that the Orthodox Church in Romania needed to return to her true mission: to serve God and to represent God in the midst of our nation." Tom Keppeler writes that "What Wesley was to the Anglican Church, Trifa was to the Romanian Orthodox Church. As Wesley's preaching and ministry drew crowds from the working classes, so Trifa's as well was a ministry that grew among the villagers and workers of the fields." In the 1930s and 1940s, "millions of Romanian Orthodox, including priests and religious, took part in its activities of evangelization, printing and open air meetings." Members of the Army of the Lord greet one another with the phrase "Praise the Lord!", followed by the reply would be "Forever, amen!"

Persecution under communism regime 
After 1948, the movement was declared illegal by the communist regime. During this period, the "Lord's Army," led by Traian Dorz in the difficult years of Stalin, who had spent 17 years in jail for this reason, was part of the "silent church," an informal ensemble of Christian believers from various denominations, which refused to obey the Communist authorities, being for this reason considered as "printing and spreading forbidden literature," "plotting against social ordering" and "enemies of the people."

See also 

Anti-religious campaign of Communist Romania
Eastern Protestantism

References

External links 
  (Official Website)
Army of the Lord (Orthodox Wiki)

Christian organizations established in 1923
Romanian Orthodox Church
Anti-communist organizations